Damaged Goods is a 1919 British silent drama film directed by Alexander Butler and starring Campbell Gullan, Marjorie Day and J. Fisher White. It was based on the 1901 play Les Avariés by Eugène Brieux. Because of the play's controversial tackling of the subject of venereal disease, the film had issues with censor boards and attracted a degree of notoriety. The film was described by one reviewer as a "masterpiece".

Cast
 Campbell Gullan as George Dupont
 Marjorie Day as Henrietta Louches
 J. Fisher White as Doctor
 James Lindsay as Rouvenal
 Joan Vivian Reese as Edith Wray
 Bassett Roe as Henry Louches
 Annie Esmond as Marie Dupont
 Winifred Dennis as The Wife

References

Bibliography
 Bamford, Kenton. Distorted Images: British National Identity and Film in the 1920s. I.B. Tauris, 1999.
 Low, Rachael. History of the British Film, 1918-1929. George Allen & Unwin, 1971.

External links

1919 films
1919 drama films
British drama films
British silent feature films
1910s English-language films
Films directed by Alexander Butler
British films based on plays
British black-and-white films
1910s British films
Silent drama films